The 1985/86 FIS Freestyle Skiing World Cup was the seventh World Cup season in freestyle skiing organised by International Ski Federation. The season started on 10 December 1985 and ended on 9 March 1986. This season included four disciplines: aerials, moguls, ballet and combined.

Men

Aerials

Ballet

Moguls

Combined

Ladies

Aerials

Ballet

Moguls

Combined

Men's standings

Overall 

Standings after 27 races.

Moguls 

Standings after 6 races.

Aerials 

Standings after 8 races.

Ballet 

Standings after 7 races.

Combined 

Standings after 6 races.

Ladies' standings

Overall 

Standings after 27 races.

Moguls 

Standings after 6 races.

Aerials 

Standings after 8 races.

Ballet 

Standings after 7 races.

Combined 

Standings after 6 races.

References

FIS Freestyle Skiing World Cup
World Cup
World Cup